Chantal Anne Akerman (6 June 19505 October 2015) was a Belgian film director, screenwriter, artist, and film professor at the City College of New York.

She is best known for films such as Jeanne Dielman, 23 quai du Commerce, 1080 Bruxelles (1975), News from Home (1977), and Les Rendez-vous d'Anna (1978); the first of these was ranked the greatest film of all time in Sight & Sound magazine's 2022 "Top 100 Greatest Films of All Time" critics poll, making her the first woman to top this poll.

According to multiple critics and film scholars, Akerman's influence on feminist and avant-garde cinema is substantial, with at least one scholar calling her "one of the most significant directors of our times."

Early life and education
Akerman was born in Brussels, Belgium, to Holocaust survivors from Poland. She was the older sister of Sylviane Akerman, her only sibling. Her mother, Natalia (Nelly), survived years at Auschwitz, where her own parents were murdered. From a young age, Akerman and her mother were exceptionally close, and her mother encouraged her to pursue a career rather than marry young.

At age 18, Akerman entered the Institut National Supérieur des Arts du Spectacle et des Techniques de Diffusion, a Belgian film school. She dropped out during her first term to make the short film Saute ma ville, funding it by trading diamond shares on the Antwerp stock exchange.

Family

Akerman had an extremely close relationship with her mother, captured in some of her films. In News from Home (1976), Akerman's mother's letters outlining mundane family activities serve as a soundtrack throughout. Her 2015 film No Home Movie centers on mother-daughter relationships, largely situated in the kitchen, and is a response to her mother's death in 2014. The film explores issues of metempsychosis, the last shot of the film acting as a memento mori of the mother's apartment.

Akerman acknowledged that her mother was at the center of her work and admitted to feeling directionless after her death. The maternal imagery can be found throughout all of Akerman's films as an homage and an attempt to reconstitute the image and voice of the mother. In Family in Brussels, Akerman narrates the story, interchanging her own voice with her mother's.

Work

Early work and influences
Akerman said that, at the age of 15, after viewing Jean-Luc Godard's Pierrot le fou (1965), she decided, that same night, to become a filmmaker.  In 1971, Akerman's first short film, Saute ma ville, premiered at the International Short Film Festival Oberhausen. That year, she moved to New York City, where she remained until 1972.

At Anthology Film Archives in New York, Akerman was impressed with the work of Stan Brakhage, Jonas Mekas, Michael Snow, Yvonne Rainer, and Andy Warhol.

Critical recognition
Her first feature film, Hotel Monterey (1972), and subsequent short films La Chambre 1 and La Chambre 2 reveal the influence of structural filmmaking through these films' usage of long takes. These protracted shots serve to oscillate images between abstraction and figuration. Akerman's films from this period also signify the start of her collaboration with cinematographer Babette Mangolte.

In 1973 Akerman returned to Belgium, and in 1974 she received critical recognition for her feature Je, Tu, Il, Elle (I, You, He, She). Feminist and queer film scholar B. Ruby Rich noted that Je Tu Il Elle can be seen as a "cinematic Rosetta Stone of female sexuality".

Akerman's most significant film, Jeanne Dielman, 23 Quai du Commerce, 1080 Bruxelles, was released in 1975. Often considered one of the greatest examples of feminist filmmaking, the film makes a hypnotic, real-time study of a middle-aged widow's stifling routine of domestic chores and prostitution. Upon the film's release, Le Monde called Jeanne Dielman the "first masterpiece of the feminine in the history of the cinema". Scholar Ivone Margulies says the picture is a filmic paradigm for uniting feminism and anti-illusionism. The film was named the 19th greatest film of the 20th century by J. Hoberman of the Village Voice. In December 2022, Jeanne Dielman was awarded first place by Sight & Sound magazine's "Top 100 Greatest Films of All Time" list, as voted for by critics, becoming the fourth film to do so after Bicycle Thieves, Citizen Kane, and Vertigo.  Jeanne Dielman, 23 Quai du Commerce, 1080 Bruxelles thus became the first film directed by a woman to top the list and, together with Beau Travail, one of the first two such films to appear in the top 10.

Feminism

Akerman has used the setting of a kitchen to explore the intersection between femininity and domesticity. The kitchens in her work provide intimate spaces for connection and conversation, functioning as a backdrop to the dramas of daily life. The kitchens, alongside other domestic spaces, act as self-confining prisons under patriarchal conditions. In Akerman's work, the kitchen acts as a domestic theatre.

Akerman is often grouped within feminist and queer thinking, but she articulated her distance from an essentialist feminism. Akerman resisted labels relating to her identity like "female", "Jewish" and "lesbian", choosing instead to immerse herself in the identity of being a daughter; she said she saw film as a "generative field of freedom from the boundaries of identity". She advocated for multiplicity of expression, explaining, "when people say there is a feminist film language, it is like saying there is only one way for women to express themselves". For Akerman, there are as many cinematic languages as there are individuals.

Marguiles argues that Akerman's resistance to categorization is in response to the rigidity of cinema's earlier essentialist realism and "indicates an awareness of the project of a transhistorical and transcultural feminist aesthetics of the cinema".

Akerman works with the feminist motto of the personal being political, complicating it by an investigation of representational links between private and public. In Jeanne Dielman, her best-known film, the protagonist does not supply a transparent, accurate representation of a fixed social reality. Throughout the film, the housewife and prostitute Jeanne is revealed to be a construct, with multiple historical, social, and cinematic resonances.

Akerman engages with realist representations, a form historically grounded to act as a feminist gesture and simultaneously as an "irritant" to fixed categories of "woman".

Later career
In 1991, Akerman was a member of the jury at the 41st Berlin International Film Festival. In 2011, she joined the full-time faculty of the MFA Program in Media Arts Production at the City College of New York as a distinguished lecturer and the first Michael & Irene Ross Visiting Professor of Film/Video & Jewish Studies. Akerman was also Professor of Film at The European Graduate School.

Exhibitions
Important solo exhibitions of Akerman's work have been held at the Museum for Contemporary Art, Antwerp, Belgium (2012), MIT, Cambridge Massachusetts (2008), the Tel Aviv Museum of Art, Israel (2006); Princeton University Art Museum, Princeton, NJ (2006); and the Centre Georges Pompidou, Paris (2003). Akerman participated in Documenta XI (2002) and the Venice Biennale (2001).

In 2011, a film retrospective of Akerman's work was shown at the Austrian Film Museum.

The 2015 Venice Biennale included her final video installation, Now, an installation of interspersed parallel screens displaying the landscape-in-motion footage that would appear in No Home Movie. In 2018, the Manhattan Jewish Museum presented the installation in the exhibition Scenes from the Collection, and acquired her work for the collection. Marian Goodman Gallery in Paris featured From the Other Side (2002) and Je tu il elle, l'installation (2007) in early 2022.

Style
Akerman's filming style relies on capturing ordinary life. By encouraging viewers to have patience with a slow pace, her films emphasize the humanity of the everyday. Art curator Kathy Halbreich writes that Akerman "creates a cinema of waiting, of passages, of resolutions deferred".

Many of Akerman's films portray the movement of people across distances or their absorption with claustrophobic spaces. Curator Jon Davies writes that her domestic interiors "conceal gendered labour and violence, secrecy and shame, where traumas both large and small unfold with few if any witnesses". Akerman addresses the voyeurism that is always present within cinematic discourse by often playing a character within her films, placing herself on both sides of the camera simultaneously. She used the boredom of structuralism to generate a bodily feeling in the viewer, accentuating the passage of time.

Akerman was influenced by European art cinema as well as structuralist film. Structuralist film used formalist experimentation to propose a reciprocal relationship between image and viewer. Akerman cites Michael Snow as a structuralist inspiration, especially his film Wavelength, which is composed of a single shot of a photograph of a sea on a loft wall, with the camera slowly zooming in. Akerman was drawn to the perceived dullness of structuralism because it rejected the dominant cinema's concern for plot. As a teenager in Brussels, Akerman skipped school to see movies, including films from the experimental festival in Knokke-le-Zoute.

Art historian Terrie Sultan writes that Akerman's "narrative is marked by an almost Proustian attention to detail and visual grace". Similarly, Akerman's visual language resists easy categorization and summarization: she creates narrative through filmic syntax instead of plot development.

Many directors have cited Akerman's directorial style as an influence on their work. Kelly Reichardt, Gus Van Sant, and Sofia Coppola have noted their exploration of filming in real time as a tribute to Akerman.

Death
65-year old Akerman died on 5 October 2015 in Paris; Le Monde reported that she died by suicide. Her last film was the documentary No Home Movie, a series of conversations with her mother shortly before her mother's death; of the film, she said: "I think if I knew I was going to do this, I wouldn't have dared to do it."

According to Akerman's sister, she had been hospitalized for depression and then returned home to Paris ten days before her death.

Filmography

Feature films

Short films

Documentaries

See also 
 List of female film and television directors
 List of lesbian filmmakers
 List of LGBT-related films directed by women

References

Further reading
 Gatti, Ilaria  Chantal Akerman. Uno schermo nel deserto Roma, Fefè Editore, 2019.
 Sultan, Terrie (ed.) Chantal Akerman: Moving through Time and Space. Houston, Tex.: Blaffer Gallery, the Art Museum of the University of Houston ; New York, N.Y.: Distributed by D.A.P./Distributed Art Publishers, 2008.
 Fabienne Liptay, Margrit Tröhler (ed.): Chantal Akerman. Munich: edition text + kritik, 2017.
 
 
 
 
 
 
 Holly Rogers and Jeremy Barham (ed.): The Music and Sound of Experimental Film. New York: Oxford University Press, 2017.
 Marente Bloemheuvel and Jaap Guldemond (ed.): Chantal Akerman: Passages. Amsterdam: Eye Filmmuseum, 2020.

External links

 chantal-akerman.foundation
 paradisefilms.be 
 Retrospective by The New York Times
 
 Artist's page in Artfacts.Net  with actual major exhibitions.
 Screens of Film, Video, Memory, and Smoke by Ana Balona de Oliveira in Fillip

1950 births
2015 deaths
20th-century Belgian women artists
21st-century Belgian women artists
Artists from Brussels
Artists who committed suicide
Belgian contemporary artists
Belgian people of Polish-Jewish descent
Belgian Jews
Belgian expatriates in France
Belgian expatriates in Germany
Belgian expatriates in Switzerland
Belgian expatriates in the United States
Belgian experimental filmmakers
Belgian screenwriters
Belgian women film directors
Belgian women film producers
City College of New York faculty
Academic staff of European Graduate School
Female suicides
French-language film directors
Jewish artists
Lesbian artists
LGBT film directors
Lesbian Jews
Belgian LGBT artists
Belgian LGBT screenwriters
Lesbian screenwriters
Suicides in France
Belgian women screenwriters
LGBT academics
2015 suicides
21st-century Belgian LGBT people